The voco St David's Cardiff Hotel is a five-star hotel situated in Cardiff, Wales, just off the A4232 road, and close to Cardiff Bay railway station. Opened originally in 1999 by Rocco Forte Hotels, since 2018 it has been operating under the Voco name.

History
The first five-star hotel in Wales, the building features a sweeping sail-topped roof and a lofty atrium lobby. Situated on Cardiff Bay, the hotel overlooks Mermaid Quay and the Cardiff Bay Barrage.

The 142-room hotel was the first new hotel built by the Rocco Forte Hotels group in the UK. The hotel was purchased by Principal Hotel Company in 2007 and again changed hands in 2018 when it was acquired by IHG, and became the second Voco hotel to be opened.

Accommodation
There are 142 guestrooms available including doubles, twins and suites.

Facilities
The St. David's Marine Spa offers thalassotherapy as well as holistic and aromatherapy treatments. Facilities include a swimming pool, marine hydrotherapy pools and a gymnasium.

References 

Hotel spas
Hotels in Cardiff
Landmarks in Cardiff
Hotels established in 1999
Hotel buildings completed in 1999
1999 establishments in Wales